An airlock is a chamber with two air-pressure-tight doors for moving between areas of different air pressure.

Airlock or air lock may also refer to:

 Air lock, an obstruction of liquid flow in pipes
 Airlock (parachute), a safety device
 Airlock (band), a Belgian trip hop group
 Airlock (video game), an action game for the Atari 2600
 Fermentation lock, a device restricting air flow during fermentation
 "Air Lock", third episode of the 1965 Doctor Who serial Galaxy 4

See also
 Vapor lock